Marjorie Greenblatt Guthrie (October 6, 1917 – March 13, 1983), who used Marjorie Mazia as her professional name, was a dancer, dance teacher, and health science activist. She was married to folk musician Woody Guthrie. Her children with him include folk musician Arlo Guthrie and Woody Guthrie Publications president Nora Guthrie.

She was a principal dancer with the Martha Graham Company. With Graham's permission, she started her own dance studio where she taught Graham methods and style.

Due to her husband's affliction with Huntington's disease, she became an activist, founding a predecessor of the Huntington's Disease Society of America.

Life and work
Marjorie Greenblatt was born in Atlantic City, New Jersey, United States, on October 6, 1917 to Aliza Waitzman and Izadore Greenblatt. Her parents were Jewish immigrants. She had three brothers -  David, Herbert and Bernard - and one sister, Gertrude. In 1935, after graduation from the Overbrook High School in Philadelphia, Pennsylvania, Marjorie moved to New York City on scholarship and joined the Martha Graham Dance Company. As a core company member, Marjorie appeared in such iconic pieces as "Primitive Mysteries", "American Document", "Every Soul is a Circus", and "Appalachian Spring". She grew to become Graham's assistant for fifteen years and was the first company member invited to teach the Graham technique independently of Martha's own school. Two of Marjorie's early students were Erick Hawkins and Merce Cunningham.

Woody Guthrie 
Mazia was introduced to Guthrie in 1940 through her activity as a Martha Graham dancer. According to the Marjorie Guthrie Project:

 

Mazia and Guthrie wed on November 13, 1945. Together they had four children; Cathy Guthrie (b. 1943/d. 1947), Arlo Guthrie (b. 1947), Joady Guthrie (b. 1948), and Nora Guthrie (1950). Cathy tragically died at age four in a fire.

Majorie Mazia School of Dance 
Mazia founded the Marjorie Mazia School of Dance, located at 1618 Sheepshead Bay Road, Brooklyn, New York. Thanks to her years with the Martha Graham Dance Company, Marjorie often had special guest dance teachers like Merce Cunningham. Marjorie's school trained young dancers in Modern Dance and Ballet in the 1950s, '60s and '70s. In 1950, Mazia recorded, Dance Along on Folkways Records, a dance album for children. She is extensively cited in the book, Outwitting History by National Yiddish Book Center founder/director Aaron Lansky.

Husband's illness 

By the late 1940s, Guthrie's health was declining. He received various misdiagnoses, but in 1952, it was finally determined that he was suffering from Huntington's disease. During the more than 15 years that the disease affected him, Marjorie stood by his side as she supervised Woody's hospital care. She even taught him to communicate by blinking his eyes after he had lost control of his other muscles. Though she was Guthrie's second wife (of three) they maintained a close relationship throughout his life and she provided constant care to Guthrie until his death. Following his death in 1967, she founded the Committee to Combat Huntington's Disease. This eventually became the Huntington's Disease Society of America.

Marjorie headed a Federal commission for control of the disease in 1976 and 1977 and convinced President Jimmy Carter to form a Presidential Commission to study neurological diseases, including Huntington's. She also headed the public and governmental information committee of the National Committee for Research in Neurological and Communicative Disorders, was a member of the New York State Commission on Health Education and Illness Prevention and of the state's Genetic Advisory Committee, and was a lay member of the advisory council of the National Institute of General Medical Science.

Joe Klein's 1980 biography, Woody Guthrie: A Life is based extensively on Marjorie Guthrie's recollections and collected papers, and contains substantial details of her life up through Woody Guthrie's death in 1967.

In 1975, Marjorie married Martin B. Stein, who was vice president of the Committee to Combat Huntington's Disease. She died of cancer on March 13, 1983.

References

1917 births
1983 deaths
People from Atlantic City, New Jersey
Marjorie
American female dancers
American dancers
American people of Ukrainian-Jewish descent
Huntington's disease
Activists from New Jersey
20th-century American Jews